Copperhouse is an eastern suburb of Hayle in west Cornwall, England. It grew up around the Copperhouse Foundry, which was run by Sandys, Carne and Vivian.

References

Populated places in Cornwall